WBS 70 (Wohnungsbauserie 70th series) is a type of dwelling that was built in the German Democratic Republic using slab construction. It was developed in the early 1970s by the German Academy of Architecture and the Technical University of Dresden. In 1973, the first block in the city was built in Neubrandenburg and this house is now a historical monument. Of the approximately 1.52 million dwellings constructed in slab construction to 1990, the Type 70 WBS is widespread, accounting for up to 42 percent of housing constructed in the East.

In Berlin-Hellersdorf, there is a museum at Hellersdorfer Strasse 179 open to visitors of the apartment type WBS 70th.  The 61-square-meter three-room apartment was furnished with original household items manufactured in the GDR.

Technical details

 Load range: 6.3 tons (63 kN)
 Modular system, basic grid: 6.00 meters × 6.00 meters
 Building depth: 10.8, 12.0 or 14.4 meters
 Floor height: 2.80 meters (WBS 70/G: 3.30 meters)
 Number of storeys: 5, 6 or 11
 Outer wall: three layers with core insulation
 Interior bathrooms, lying outside staircase

Functional features

 Minimizing traffic areas in buildings and housing for the benefit of living space
 Variability of apartment sizes and occupancy density by assembling the different functional units
 Adjust the number of stories and the outline of the floor plans to the functional and urban demands by vertical and horizontal combination of functional units.

References

External links

Museum in Berlin-Hellersdorf
„Platte mit Aussicht“ - Dokumentarfilm zur Plattenbausiedlung Dresden-Gorbitz ("Panel With A View" - Documentary council estate Dresden Gorbitz)

Apartment types
Housing in Germany
Economy of East Germany